Nicos Stavrou (born 2 April 1971) is a retired Cypriot football defender.

References

1971 births
Living people
Cypriot footballers
Olympiakos Nicosia players
ENTHOI Lakatamia FC players
Association football forwards
Cypriot First Division players
Cyprus international footballers